Diego Andrés Cruciani (born 14 July 1962 in Bahía Blanca) is an Argentine football coach who currently appointed as a head of Bangladesh Premier League club Saif Sporting Club

Career
The defender played in his career for Juventud, Sarmiento, Bella Vista, Estudiantes and Club Cipolletti before he retired after a knee injury in summer 1985.

International career
Cruciani was 1985 member of the Argentina national under-20 football team.

Coaching career
He was the head coach of the Bangladesh national football team, under his guidance, the team improved smoothly and became the runners-up of the SAFF championship.

After leaving the post, Cruciani continued his career in Bangladesh by coaching B. League side, Abahani. During his time, Cruciani had brought three Argentine players to the club.

References

1962 births
Living people
Argentine footballers
Argentine Primera División players
Expatriate football managers in Bangladesh
Bangladesh national football team managers
Haiti national football team managers
Argentine football managers
Association football central defenders
Club Atlético Sarmiento footballers
Club Atlético Huracán managers
Estudiantes de La Plata footballers
Club Atlético Banfield managers
Club Atlético Independiente managers
Expatriate soccer managers in the United States
Club Atlético Lanús managers
Argentine expatriate football managers
Expatriate football managers in Haiti
Expatriate football managers in the Maldives
Maldives national football team managers
Bella Vista de Bahía Blanca footballers
Bangladesh Football Premier League managers
Argentine expatriate sportspeople in Haiti
Argentine expatriate sportspeople in Bangladesh
Argentine expatriate sportspeople in the Maldives
Sportspeople from Bahía Blanca
Abahani Limited Dhaka managers